Ofatinți (Moldovan Cyrillic: Офатинць, Vykhvatyntsi; , Vykhvatintsy), is a commune in the Rîbnița District of Transnistria, Moldova. It is composed of two villages, Novaia Jizni (Nove Zhyttia) and Ofatinți. It is located 15 km south of Rîbnița.

Historically a small trading port on the Dniester river, during the 19th century, it was part of the Podolian Governorate of the Russian Empire. The famous Russian composer Anton Rubinstein was born in Ofatinți.

References

Communes of Transnistria
Bratslav Voivodeship
Baltsky Uyezd
Rîbnița District